Bauska, previously Uzvara lauks, is a Latvian Floorball League team based in Bauska, Latvia.

Goaltenders
  1  Elvis Holsts
29  Uģis Upenieks

Defencemen
  8  Pēteris Maziks
14  Andis Levītis
21  Māris Lasmanis
77  Toms Grunckis
89  Ģirts Laugalis

Forwards
  9  Rihards Mallons
15  Ingus Panteļējevs
17  Edgars Brakše
22  Edgars Lujāns
23  Raitis Cimermanis
27  Gvido Zuika
28  Māris Akmentiņš
69  Jānis Akmentiņš
76  Gatis Feldmanis
91  Pēteris Zeltiņš
99  Elvijs Artamovičs

Bauska
Floorball in Latvia
Latvian floorball teams